The 2017 KNSB Dutch Sprint Championships in speed skating were held in Heerenveen at the Thialf ice skating rink from 21 January to 22 January 2017. The tournament was part of the 2016–2017 speed skating season. Ronald Mulder and Ireen Wüst won the sprint titles. The sprint championships were held at the same time as the 2017 KNSB Dutch Allround Championships.

Schedule

Medalist

Men's sprint

Women's sprint

Classification

Men's sprint

Women's sprint

Source:

References

KNSB Dutch Sprint Championships
KNSB Dutch Sprint Championships
2017 Sprint